Hyderabad State was a princely state located in the south-central Deccan region of India with its capital at the city of Hyderabad. It is now divided into the present-day state of Telangana, the Kalyana-Karnataka region of Karnataka, and the Marathwada region of Maharashtra in India.

The state was ruled from 1724 to 1857 by the Nizam, who was initially a viceroy of the Mughal empire in the Deccan. Hyderabad gradually became the first princely state to come under British paramountcy signing a subsidiary alliance agreement. During the British rule in 1901, the state had an average revenue of Rs. 417,000,000, making it the wealthiest princely state in India. The native inhabitants of Hyderabad Deccan, regardless of ethnic origin, are called "Mulki" (countryman), a term still used today.

The dynasty declared itself an independent monarchy during the final years of the British Raj.  After the Partition of India, Hyderabad signed a standstill agreement with the new dominion of India, continuing all previous arrangements except for the stationing of Indian troops in the state. Hyderabad's location in the middle of the Indian union, as well as its diverse cultural heritage, was a driving force behind India's annexation of the state in 1948. Subsequently, Mir Osman Ali Khan, the 7th Nizam, signed an instrument of accession, joining India.

History

Early history
Hyderabad State was founded by Mir Qamar-ud-din Khan who was the governor of Deccan under the Mughals from 1713 to 1721. In 1724, he resumed rule from the Mughal provincial capital of Aurangabad, under the title of Asaf Jah (granted by Mughal Emperor Muhammad Shah). His other title, Nizam ul-Mulk (Order of the Realm), became the title of his position "Nizam of Hyderabad". By the end of his rule, the Nizam had become independent from the Mughals, and had founded the Asaf Jahi dynasty.

Following the decline of the Mughal power, the region of Deccan saw the rise of the Maratha Empire. The Nizam himself saw many invasions by the Marathas in the 1720s, which resulted in the Nizam paying a regular Chauth (tax) to the Marathas. The major battles fought between the Marathas and the Nizam include Palkhed, Rakshasbhuvan, and Kharda. Following the conquest of Deccan by Bajirao I and the imposition of chauth by him, Nizam remained a tributary of the Marathas for all intent and purposes.

In 1763, the Nizam shifted the capital to the city of Hyderabad. From 1778, a British resident and soldiers were installed in his dominions. In 1795, the Nizam lost some of his own territories to the Marathas. The territorial gains of the Nizam from Mysore as an ally of the British were ceded to the British to meet the cost of maintaining the British soldiers.

British suzerainty

Hyderabad was a  region in the Deccan, ruled by the head of the Asaf Jahi dynasty, who had the title of Nizam and on whom was bestowed the style of "His Exalted Highness" by the British. The last Nizam, Mir Osman Ali Khan, was the world's richest man in the 1930s.

In 1798, Nizam ʿĀlī Khan (Asaf ) was forced to enter into an agreement that put Hyderabad under British protection. He was the first Indian prince to sign such an agreement. (Consequently, the ruler of Hyderabad rated a 23-gun salute during the period of British India.) The Crown retained the right to intervene in case of misrule.

Hyderabad under Asaf Jah II was a British ally in the second and third Maratha Wars (1803–05, 1817–19), Anglo-Mysore wars, and would remain loyal to the British during the Indian Rebellion of 1857 (1857–58).

His son, Asaf Jah III Mir Akbar Ali Khan (known as Sikandar Jah) ruled from 1803 to 1829. During his rule, a British cantonment was built in Hyderabad and the area was named in his honor, Secunderabad. The British Residency at Koti was also built during his reign by the then British Resident James Achilles Kirkpatrick.

Sikander Jah was succeeded by Asaf Jah IV, who ruled from 1829 to 1857, and was succeeded by his son Asaf Jah V.

Asaf Jah V 
Asaf Jah V's reign from 1857 to 1869 was marked by reforms by his Prime Minister Salar Jung I. Before this time, there was no regular or systematic form of administration, and the duties were in the hand of the Diwan (Prime Minister), and corruption was thus widespread.

In 1867, the State was divided into five divisions and seventeen districts, and subedars (governors) were appointed for the five Divisions and talukdars and tehsildars for the districts. The judicial, public works, medical, educational, municipal, and police departments were re-organised. In 1868, sadr-i-mahams (Assistant Ministers) were appointed for the Judicial, Revenue, Police, and Miscellaneous Departments.

Asaf Jah VI 
Asaf Jah VI Mir Mahbub Ali Khan became the Nizam at the age of three years. His regents were Salar Jung I and Shams-ul-Umra III and later on Asman Jah and Viqar-ul-Umra. He assumed full rule at the age of 17, and ruled until his death in 1911. His reign saw the official language of Hyderabad State shift from Persian to Urdu, a change implemented in the 1880s during the short tenure of Prime Minister Salar Jung II.

The Nizam's Guaranteed State Railway was established during his reign to connect Hyderabad State to the rest of British India. It was headquartered at Secunderabad Railway Station. The railway marked the beginning of industry in Hyderabad, and factories were built in Hyderabad city.

During his rule, the Great Musi Flood of 1908 struck the city of Hyderabad, which killed an estimated 50,000 people. The Nizam opened all his palaces for public asylum.

He also abolished Sati where women used to jump into their husband's burning pyre, by issuing a royal firman.

Asaf Jah VII 
The last Nizam of Hyderabad Mir Osman Ali Khan ruled the state from 1911 until 1948. He was given the title "Faithful Ally of the British Empire". The Nizam's rule saw growth of Hyderabad economically and culturally.The Nizam's government invited technocrats from world over for the development of Hyderabad as part of nation building. It has its own foreign policy and established foreign relations with many countries outside of British India. Nizam's government also established its embassy in the new capital of New Delhi. It commissioned Sir Edwin Lutyens to design and construct Hyderabad House as its embassy to deal with British India since Hyderabad was an important British ally. Osmania University and several schools and colleges were founded throughout the state. Many writers, poets, intellectuals and other eminent people (including Fani Badayuni, Dagh Dehlvi, Josh Malihabadi, Ali Haider Tabatabai, Shibli Nomani, Nawab Mohsin-ul-Mulk, Mirza Ismail) migrated from all parts of India to Hyderabad during the reign of Asaf Jah VII, and his father and predecessor Asaf Jah VI. Apart from the above people, many technocrats also migrated to Hyderabad on the invitation of the govt to develop Hyderabad with all its sustainable modern infrastructure which is still serving the great Hyderabad metropolis in all its brilliance.

The Nizam also established Hyderabad State Bank. Hyderabad was the only independent state in Indian subcontinent which had its own currency, the Hyderabadi rupee. The Begumpet Airport was established in the 1930s with formation of Hyderabad Aero Club by the Nizam. Initially it was used as a domestic and international airport for the Nizam's Deccan Airways, the earliest airline in British India. The terminal building was created in 1937.

In order to prevent another great flood, the Nizam also constructed two lakes, namely the Osman Sagar and Himayath Sagar. The Osmania General Hospital, Jubilee Hall, State Library (then known as Asifia Kutubkhana) and Public Gardens (then known as Bagh e Aam) were constructed during this period.

After Indian Independence (1947–48)

In 1947 India gained independence and Pakistan came into existence. The British left the local rulers of the princely states the choice of whether to join one or the other, or to remain independent. On 11 June 1947, the Nizam issued a declaration to the effect that he had decided not to participate in the Constituent Assembly of either Pakistan or India.

However, the Nizams were Muslim ruling over a predominantly Hindu population.
India insisted that the great majority of residents wanted to join India.

The Nizam was in a weak position as his army numbered only 24,000 men, of whom only some 6,000 were fully trained and equipped.

On 21 August 1948, the Secretary-General of the Hyderabad Department of External Affairs requested the President of the United Nations' Security Council, under Article 35(2) of the United Nations Charter, to consider the "grave dispute, which, unless settled in accordance with international law and justice, is likely to endanger the maintenance of international peace and security".

On 4 September the Prime Minister of Hyderabad Mir Laiq Ali announced to the Hyderabad Assembly that a delegation was about to leave for Lake Success, headed by Moin Nawaz Jung. The Nizam also appealed, without success, to the British Labour Government and to the King for assistance, to fulfill their obligations and promises to Hyderabad by "immediate intervention". Hyderabad only had the support of Winston Churchill and the British Conservatives.

At 4 a.m. on 13 September 1948, India's Hyderabad Campaign, code-named "Operation Polo" by the Indian Army, began. Indian troops invaded Hyderabad from all points of the compass. On 13 September 1948, the Secretary-General of the Hyderabad Department of External Affairs in a cablegram informed the United Nations Security Council that Hyderabad was being invaded by Indian forces and that hostilities had broken out. The Security Council took notice of it on 16 September in Paris. The representative of Hyderabad called for immediate action by the Security Council under Chapter VII of the United Nations Charter. The Hyderabad representative responded to India's excuse for the intervention by pointing out that the Stand-still Agreement between the two countries had expressly provided that nothing in it should give India the right to send in troops to assist in the maintenance of internal order.

At 5 p.m. on 17 September the Nizam's army surrendered. The Government of Hyderabad resigned, and military governors and chief ministers were appointed by the Nizam at India's direction.

On 26 January 1950, India formally incorporated the state of Hyderabad into the Union of India and ended the rule of the Nizams.

Hyderabad State (1948–56) 

After the incorporation of Hyderabad State into India, M. K. Vellodi was appointed as Chief Minister of the state and Mir Osman Ali Khan became the Rajpramukh on 26 January 1950. He was a Senior Civil servant in the Government of India. He administered the state with the help of bureaucrats from Madras state and Bombay state.

In the 1952 Legislative Assembly election, Dr. Burgula Ramakrishna Rao was elected Chief Minister of Hyderabad State. During this time there were violent agitations by some Telanganites to send back bureaucrats from Madras state, and to strictly implement 'Mulki-rules' (local jobs for locals only), which was part of Hyderabad state law since 1919.

Dissolution
In 1956 during the reorganisation of the Indian States based along linguistic lines, the state of Hyderabad was split up among Andhra Pradesh and Bombay state (later divided into states of Maharashtra and Gujarat in 1960 with the original portions of Hyderabad becoming part of the state of Maharashtra and Karnataka.

On 2 June 2014, the state of Telangana was formed splitting from the rest of Andhra Pradesh state and formed the 29th state of India, with Hyderabad as its capital.

Government and politics

Government

Wilfred Cantwell Smith states that Hyderabad was an area where the political and social structure from medieval Muslim rule had been preserved more or less intact into the modern times. The last Nizam was reputed to be the wealthiest man in the world. He was supported by an aristocracy of 1,100 feudal lords who owned a further 30% of the state's land, with some 4 million tenant farmers. The state also owned 50% or more of the capital in all the major enterprises, allowing the Nizam to earn further profits and control their affairs.

Next in the social structure were the administrative and official class, comprising about 1,500 officials. A number of them were recruited from outside the state. The lower level government employees were also predominantly Muslim. Effectively, the Muslims of the Hyderabad represented an 'upper caste' of the social structure.

All power was vested in the Nizam. He ruled with the help of an Executive Council or Cabinet, established in 1893, whose members he was free to appoint and dismiss. The government of the Nizam recruited heavily from the North Indian Hindu Kayastha caste for administrative posts. There was also an Assembly, whose role was mostly advisory. More than half its members were appointed by the Nizam and the rest elected from a carefully limited franchise. There were representatives of Hindus, Parsis, Christians and Depressed Classes in the Assembly. Their influence was however limited due to their small numbers.

The state government also had a large number of outsiders (called non-mulkis) – 46,800 of them in 1933, including all the members of the Nizam's Executive Council. Hindus and Muslims united in protesting against the practice which robbed the locals of government employment. The movement, however, fizzled out after the Hindu members raised the issue of 'responsible government', which was of no interest to the Muslim members and led to their resignation.

Various properties and wealth owned by the Nizam as part of Hyderabad State are now succeeded by his descendants, including his grandsons Prince Mukarram Jah, Prince  Mufakkam Jah & Prince Shahmat Jah and his great-grandson Himayat Ali Mirza among others. Himayat Ali Mirza, great-grandson of the Nizam, remarked that his stake in the English state sums up to 36% of the total amount. For claiming the total share of £35 million, Nizam’s great-grandson, Himayat Ali Mirza, reached the London High Court.

Political movements
Up to 1920, there was no political organisation of any kind in Hyderabad. In that year, following British pressure, the Nizam issued a firman appointing a special officer to investigate constitutional reforms. It was welcomed enthusiastically by a section of the populace, who formed the Hyderabad State Reforms Association. However, the Nizam and the Special Officer ignored all their demands for consultation. Meanwhile, the Nizam banned the Khilafat movement in the State as well as all political meetings and the entry of "political outsiders". Nevertheless, some political activity did take place and witnessed co-operation between Hindus and Muslims. The abolition of the Sultanate in Turkey and Gandhi's suspension of the Non-co-operation movement in British India ended this period of co-operation.

An organisation called Andhra Jana Sangham (later renamed Andhra Mahasabha) was formed in November 1921, and focused on educating the masses of Telangana in political awareness. With leading members such as Madapati Hanumantha Rao, Burgula Ramakrishna Rao and M. Narsing Rao, its activities included urging merchants to resist offering freebies to government officials and encouraging labourers to resist the system of begar (free labour requested at the behest of state). Alarmed by its activities, the Nizam passed a powerful gagging order in 1929, requiring all public meetings to obtain prior permission. But the organisation persisted by mobilising on social issues such as the protection of ryots, women's rights, abolition of the devadasi system and purdah, uplifting of Dalits etc. It turned to politics again in 1937, passing a resolution calling for responsible government. Soon afterwards, it split along the moderate–extremist lines. The Andhra Mahasabha's move towards politics also inspired similar movements in Marathwada and Karnataka in 1937, giving rise to the Maharashtra Parishad and Karnataka Parishad respectively.

Military

Hyderabad's first ruler, Asaf Jah I was a talented commander and assembled a powerful army that allowed Hyderabad to become one of the preeminent states in southern India. After his death, the military was crippled by the succession wars of his sons. It was restored under Nizam Ali Khan, Asaf Jah II (r. 1762–1803) who modernized the army. Notable units during his reign included British-trained battalions, the French-trained Corps Français de Raymond which was led by Michel Joachim Marie Raymond and fought under the French Tricolour, and the Victorious Battalion, an elite infantry unit entirely composed of women.

Culture

Symbols

Coat of Arms 
The coat of arms features the full titles of the Nizam at the bottom, and a dastar

Flag 
Under the leadership of Asaf Jah V the state changed its traditional heraldic flag.
The Asafia flag of Hyderabad. The script along the top reads Al Azmatulillah meaning "All greatness is for God". The bottom script reads Ya Uthman which translates to "Oh Osman". The writing in the middle reads "Nizam-ul-Mulk Asif Jah"

Stamps 

The stamps of the Hyderabad State featured the Golconda Fort, Ajanta Caves, and the Charminar.

Anthem 
The National Anthem of Nizam's Dominion, better known as "O Osman", was the national anthem of the kingdom of Hyderabad until its annexation by India. It was composed by John Fredrick during the time of 7th Nizam Mir Osman Ali Khan.

Other symbols

Demographics

Mulki 
Mulkis or Mulkhis, are the native inhabitants of the erstwhile Hyderabad State, regardless of ethnic differences. The term was popularly used during the 1952 Mulkhi Agitation (Telangana), which saw protests demanding job reservations for Mulki people, and demanding non-Mulkis to leave.

As per the 1941 Hyderabad State Census, 2,187,005 people spoke Urdu, 7,529,229 people spoke Telugu, 3,947,089 people spoke Marathi, 1,724,180 people spoke Kanarese (Kannada) as native languages. The Hyderabadi Muslim population, including the ruling Asaf Jahi dynasty numbered around 2,097,475 people, while Hindus numbered around 9,171,318 people.

Architecture 

The architecture of Hyderabad State is very cosmopolitan in nature, and heavily influenced by European and Islamic styles. The Nizam's palaces and several public buildings were built in a distinctive style. The earliest surviving buildings are purely European, examples being the neoclassical British Residency (1798) and Falaknuma Palace (1893). In the early 20th century, the Osmania General Hospital
City College, High Court, and Kacheguda Railway station were designed in the Indo-Saracenic style by Vincent Esch. The Moazzam Jahi Market was also built in a similar style.

Industries

Various major industries emerged in various parts of the State of Hyderabad before its incorporation into the Union of India, especially during the first half of the twentieth century. Hyderabad city had a separate powerplant for electricity. However, the Nizams focused industrial development on the region of Sanathnagar, housing a number of industries there with transportation facilities by both road and rail.

See also

Notes

References

Bibliography

Further reading

 

 

 
 Sherman, Taylor C. "Migration, citizenship and belonging in Hyderabad (Deccan), 1946–1956." Modern Asian Studies 45#1 (2011): 81–107.
 Sherman, Taylor C. "The integration of the princely state of Hyderabad and the making of the postcolonial state in India, 1948–56." Indian Economic & Social History Review 44#4 (2007): 489–516.

External links

 (archived 12 January 2009)

Princely states of India
Muslim princely states of India
History of Telangana
Princely states of Maharashtra
1948 disestablishments in India
1724 establishments in India
States and territories established in 1724
States and territories disestablished in 1948
Historical Indian regions
Empires and kingdoms of India